Yoshimatsu (written: 吉松) may refer to:

, former town in Aira District, Kagoshima Prefecture, Japan
, train station in Aira District
Yoshimatsu (name)